The Qaa hathutha dam is a dam in Saudi Arabia opened in 2001 and located in Madinah region.

See also 

 List of dams in Saudi Arabia

References 

Dams in Saudi Arabia